Coolamon Shire is a local government area in the Riverina region of south-western New South Wales, Australia. The Shire comprises  and is located adjacent to the Newell Highway and the Burley Griffin Way. The Shire includes the towns of Coolamon, Ganmain, and Ardlethan, and the villages of Matong, Marrar, and Beckom.

The mayor of the Coolamon Shire Council is Cr. David McCann, an independent politician.

History

Coolamon Shire was first incorporated on 6 March 1906 by a Proclamation under the Local Government (Shires) Act 1905. The boundaries of the Shire were defined as:

On 15 May 1906 a Temporary Council of five members was appointed by Proclamation. The temporary councillors were: Henry Doubleday, David Hannah, William Henry Rowston, William Steele and George Webb.

The first meeting of the temporary Shire Council was held on 12 June 1906 in the Coolamon Court House. At this meeting Councillor William Rowston was elected as the chairman and the council resolved to nominate Mr J.E.A Florance as shire secretary, subject to ministerial approval. The Council was initially divided into three "Ridings" each returning two councillors. The first elections to the council took place on Saturday 24 November 1906. With only the "A Riding" being contested.

The councillors elected in the inaugural election were: Riding A - William Rowston and Thomas Joseph Kelly; Riding B - Henry Doubleday and Thomas E. Lucas; Riding C - John Poiner and Randal King Pike. 

The first meeting of the permanent Shire Council was held on 10 December 1906 at which Cr. Henry Doubleday was elected as the first President.

On 01 May 1912 the Coolamon Urban Area was Proclaimed, increasing the Council's powers to that of a municipality in respect of that Urban Area. Ganmain and Ardlethan were likewise proclaimed as Urban Areas on 14 Oct 1914.

Council

Current composition and election method
Coolamon Shire Council is composed of nine councillors elected proportionally as a single ward. All councillors are elected for a fixed four-year term of office. The mayor is elected by the councillors at the first meeting of the council. In the most recent election held on 4 December 2021, and the makeup of the council is as follows:

The current Council, elected in 2016, is:

References

 
Local government areas of New South Wales
Local government areas of the Riverina